Robert "Rusty" Stevens (born 1948) is an American former child actor best remembered for his role as Larry Mondello, Theodore "Beaver" Cleaver's young friend, in the original Leave It to Beaver television series. Stevens appeared in 67 of the show's 234 episodes, between 1957 and 1960.

Career
Stevens was reported to have left the show in 1960 because his family moved from Burbank to Philadelphia. Barbara Billingsley, who played "June Cleaver" on the series, said in a TV Archive interview that Stevens was fired because his overbearing stage mother caused grief for the producers of the series.

Stevens briefly returned to acting when he reprised his role as Larry Mondello in the 1983 made-for-television reunion movie Still the Beaver.

Partial filmography

References

External links

1948 births
American male television actors
American male child actors
Living people
Male actors from Boston
Male actors from Los Angeles